Primorskyibacter aestuariivivens is a Gram-negative, aerobic, non-spore-forming and motile bacterium from the genus of Primorskyibacter which has been isolated from tidal flat sediments from Oido in Korea.

References

External links
Type strain of Primorskyibacter aestuariivivens at BacDive -  the Bacterial Diversity Metadatabase

Rhodobacteraceae
Bacteria described in 2016